Robotboy is a British-French animated television series produced by Gaumont Animation (originally Alphanim) for France 3 and Cartoon Network Europe, in association with studios LuxAnimation and Cofinova 1 for Series 1 only. In a total of 52 23-minute episodes with 104 segments produced, it was created and designed by Jan Van Rijsselberge.

The series was directed at Alphanim's studio in Vincennes by American animator Charlie Bean—who worked on Dexter's Laboratory, The Powerpuff Girls, and Samurai Jack—and later with Bob Camp and Heath Kenny.

It debuted in the United Kingdom on November 1, 2005, on Cartoon Network. Prior to debuting its airdate, the series was shown during the MIPCOM annual trading program on October 12, 2005.

It later premiered reportedly in the United States on December 28, 2005, for Cartoon Network's "Sneak Peek Week" for their new lineup premiering on January 14, 2006. Reruns of the series have broadcast around Europe and Latin America, with fewer exceptions shown in Asia.

Plot
Robotboy is the latest creation of the world-renowned scientist Professor Moshimo. Due to suspicions that Robotboy would be taken by his arch-enemy Dr. Kamikazi and his main henchman Constantine to be used to take over the world, Professor Moshimo assigns Robotboy to 10-year-old Tommy Turnbull, his biggest fan living in San Francisco. While being protected by Tommy and his two friends Lola and Augustus, Robotboy learns how to behave and act as if he were human while occasionally battling Kamikazi and Constantine who pursued to capture him.

Episodes

Cast
 Lawrence Bouvard as Robotboy, Robotgirl, Lola Mbola, Miu-Miu, Hester Turner, additional voices
 Lorraine Pilkington as Tommy Turnbull, Debbie Turnbull, and Computer Teacher
 Rupert Degas as Augustus Bachman Turner, Constantine, Protoboy, Donnie Turnbull, Kurt, Ambassador Mbola, Brian the Consultant, Stu, Mookie, Walter the Tapeworm, Jebidiah Turner, Mr. Fournier, additional voices
 Lewis MacLeod as Dwight Turnbull, Felonius Hexx, Special Agent, Bjorn Bjornson, General Yakitori, Principal Dr. Friedman-Culpepper, additional voices
 Eiji Kusuhara as Dr. Kamikazi
 Togo Igawa as Professor Moshimo

Characters

Protagonists
  – The titular character who are best friends with Tommy Turnbull. He is a robot created by Professor Moshimo as a force to protect the world from threats after Protoboy failed, as he was captured and reprogrammed by Kazi. He intended to enter him into a robot-competition television program. Prior to this, Kazi learned of Robotboy and intended to steal him to take over the world. Knowing the evil he could do with Robotboy, despite that he was in danger, Moshimo sent him to Tommy Turnbull. According to the opening sequence, Robotboy was given to Tommy for him to learn about the world and how to become human but never stated the longer he had been activated or why Tommy was his chosen guardian. He has the following modes:
 Deactivated – Robotboy's inanimate "toy" mode. In it, he is small in size and he is unable to move or talk. However, he is seen lighting up his eyes and smiling in several episodes.
 Activated – While activated, Robotboy can talk, express emotions (via emotion chip), fly, fight, and use some special abilities introduced throughout the series. 
 Superactivated – Activated when Robotboy hits his hands together, increasing his size and overall strength greatly. He can shoot down enemies with a variety of weapons at his disposal, but his main weapon is "Gatling Lasers". While superactivated, his speech was provided through growl-like noises when he became evil in "Crying Time".
  – Robotboy's 10-year-old owner and human best friend. He acts as a role model and mentor/father figure to Robotboy and cares deeply for him. Unlike Gus, he is bright, sensible, kind, and responsible, although he gets criticized by Dwight for being rather nerdy/not getting enough exercise.
  – Tommy's fat, rude, self-centered, and dumb best friend. Despite coming from an Amish family, Gus is "the black sheep" of the bunch. He is infatuated with food and video games. Usually, it is his selfish nature that gets everyone into situations caused by Dr. Kamikazi.
  – 10-year-old Lola is the confident and smart daughter of a wealthy African ambassador, Kingsley Mbola. She can fly jet planes and control speedboats despite her age and secretly has a crush on Tommy.

Supporting
  – Professor Moshimo is the creator of Robotboy, Robotgirl, Protoboy, and Robotman. He received a letter from Tommy Turnbull about him looking forward to his latest invention. As a result, Professor Moshimo sent him Robotboy to take care of. The Professor has a Japanese fiancée named Miu-Miu, who also acts as his assistant. He also created Protoboy, Robotman and Robotgirl. His former rivals are Dr. Kamikazi and Björn Bjornson.
  – Professor Moshimo's fiancée and lab assistant. She is typically depicted as silent, however, she speaks for the first time in the episode "Grow No-Mo". While she rarely talks, she seems annoyed with Moshimo's many hobbies. She is voiced by Laurence Bouvard.
  – Robotboy's female counterpart and sister. A super fighting robot just like Robotboy, who was introduced in the namesake episode and her final appearance was in "The Return of Robotgirl". She quickly made good friends with Robotboy and was only seen superactivated twice, both times in the episode "Robotgirl". In the first place, she had to be convinced by Moshimo to use her ultimate powers, otherwise, she would never see her friends again. In "The Return of Robotgirl" she was brought back to Tommy with a distress message by Moshimo, she could not be activated until she was repaired by Tommy and she suffered from major memory loss but was convinced by Lola to use her emotions in favor of the kids' team. In the end, she was defeated in a fight against Protoboy but was saved by Robotboy.

Antagonists
  – A small, old man with thick glasses and a suit/bathrobe combo who is a self-proclaimed evil genius and the main antagonist of the series. He wishes to capture Robotboy to create a template for an army of super robots, with which he will be able to achieve his dastardly goal of world domination. Most of his mutant henchmen have a large letter K on their uniforms, to show that they are on Dr. Kamikazi's side. He has had many pets, ranging from snakes to cats, but as a running gag they normally always hurt him.
  – A fat hunchbacked hitman or henchman of Kazi who also is a master of sumo wrestling. He is a sensitive and non-too-threatening sidekick to Kazi who mainly acts as his muscle power as well as his assistant. Constantine is also a refined chef, being able to create dishes ranging from Sashimi to tapas. It is mentioned occasionally that Constantine used to be an orphan before he began working for Kazi. Despite presumably being Japanese, Constantine can speak Spanish as shown in "Metal Monster". He is also shown to be constantly pushed around and inadequately treated by Kazi—even nearly getting killed by him in one episode, but yet he stays with him regardless as he feels he owes him his life for saving him. In one episode he was abruptly fired and replaced but returned in the same episode as Kazi finally apologized. He is also shown to be compassionate to Tommy and his friends from time to time depending on the situation they're in.
  – Tommy's big brother and secondary archenemy, he is a constant bully to every child in the neighborhood, including Gus and Tommy himself. He frequently calls people's names, threatens them, beats them up, etc., and yet despite this, Tommy's high moral compass forces him to still treat him as family. Some people exploit his attitude and poor intelligence for their benefit, usually Dr. Kamikazi. His bullying backfires in several ways, such as in "Donnie Turnbull's Day Off" when Robotboy drives him crazy when he decides to play hooky from school in order to humiliate, expose and possibly destroy Robotboy.
  – A sadistic bully at Tommy's school, he has blond hair and wears a hat. He constantly bullies Gus and Tommy, as well as any other kid he finds. His dad is a government agent who has used Kurt to try and capture Robotboy. Tommy sometimes has outsmarted Kurt and his cronies by outwitting them, usually with Robotboy. They became less frequent adversaries of Tommy after he fought them all at once and won all by himself (even if he thought Robotboy was helping him).
  – a Secret Agent who strives to take Robotboy to reproduce him so he can use him for Government Means. Although his name is never mentioned, he's shown to be in a very low tier in his position. His halting vocal inflections are reminiscent of Christopher Walken. His base is located in the Transamerica Pyramid.
  – Kurt's friends/henchmen. Stu is the largest and least intelligent of the group. He wears a blue hoodie with a red cap. Mookie is the smallest bully in the group, in the absence of Kurt, is the leader. He wears a dark red beanie which happens to have a bowling ball hidden inside.
  – A Queen Bee-like character and Tommy's love interest. Despite being clearly out of his league and already having Kurt as a boyfriend. Tommy still attempts to get her attention despite being treated like he doesn't exist. She is shown to harbor some affection for him from time to time when the situation benefits Tommy's importance, even if it actually goes against his friends, especially Lola, who all tell him to stay away from her.
  – A Nordic egotistical boy genius who is about Tommy's age and claims to be a greater genius than Professor Moshimo. He has his own robot double named Björnbot, who is sometimes referred to as Brother Björn. Both were first introduced in the episode of the same name – "Brother Björn". Their mission is to destroy Moshimo's creation—Robotboy, so Björnbot would be "the greatest fighting robot in the world".
  – Björnbot is a robotic lookalike of his creator Björn Björnson. He has weapon capabilities and strength equal to that of Robotboy—as well as superactivation. It seems that Björn himself has created several Björnbots. Björnbot has his own form of Superactivation. Unlike Robotboy, he lacks emotion and has a rather flat vocabulary (which consists mostly of the word "Ja!") Robotboy thinks of strategies in battles and Robotboy overcomes Björnbot. In the episode Party Out of Bounds, he dressed as a girl and Björn called him Sister Björn. In more recent episodes, he seems to have become more hyperactive.
  – Robotboy's long-lost brother, who was created by Moshimo in his earlier years, but later that same day he was taken by young Kazi and Constantine and turned overly evil to control. He was then forcibly deactivated by Constantine and stored in a large storage room inside Kamikazi's quarters in Kaziland until he was saved by Robotboy. With the ability to superactivate like his brother, the cannon built into his left arm is static and cannot be switched with an arm or another weapon. His brother was seen superactivated in Protoboy's body in "The Old Switcharobot", neither his cannon was damaged because Protoboy (in Robotboy's body) had removed some of its parts before body transfer illusion.
  – A wealthy man from Germany with implied extreme myopathy, who wants to use Robotboy's parts to replace his own. He has been pushed around, harassed, beaten up, and abused by virtually everybody he knew since childhood because of his disease. Because of his deformity, Klaus is carried around by his bodyguard, colleague, assistant, and best friend, a giant orangutan named Ludwig, the only living being who really cared about him in his time of need.
  – After being taunted by everyone, Klaus went near a zoo, where a missing orangutan, Ludwig, decided to protect him and give him company. He is a large orangutan who serves as his assistant to Klaus at all times.
  – the best-known magician who had his career ruined after getting ridiculed and humiliated by Gus during his performance, and ever since he's been a recurring villain. From one job to another, he's always ready to get back at Gus and/or possibly kill him given the chance.
  – Tommy's Principal and nemesis. She is a liar and is infatuated with toys due to never being allowed to play with them in her childhood, instead having to make her own dolls out of tin foil and chicken bones. She abuses her position as principal to confiscate toys and play with them herself. She later returns for revenge to ruin Robotboy's cliffhanger and play with him forever.
  – Friedman-Culpepper henchman, who was the school janitor.
  – A super-intelligent Yak given a new brain by Professor Moshimo, because he had been made fun of him for being fully mindless. After Moshimo gave him a Brain Transplant, he became even more solitary and badly treated by the rest of the herd for being too intelligent. Then Moshimo encouraged this behavior because he didn't think it was a problem. After disappearing for a few decades, he seeks revenge for being excluded from his herd and being mistreated by Moshimo time and time again.

Reception
Common Sense Media gave the show 2 out 5 stars and the disclaimer: "Robot's firepower makes show iffy for kids".

Home video and digital releases
StudioCanal released three DVD volumes of Robotboy from 2007 only in France. As of October 2019, Series 2 is currently available on Starz's streaming service in the United States, leaving Series 1 currently unavailable. The complete series were shown available in both English and French via YouTube.

References

External links

 Robotboy at Cartoon Network
 
 

Robotboy
2000s British animated television series
2000s British comic science fiction television series
2005 British television series debuts
2008 British television series endings
2005 French television series debuts
2009 French television series endings
2000s French animated television series
Television series created by Jan Van Rijsselberge
British children's animated action television series
British children's animated adventure television series
British children's animated comic science fiction television series
British children's animated science fantasy television series
British children's animated superhero television series
French children's animated action television series
French children's animated adventure television series
French children's animated comic science fiction television series
French children's animated science fantasy television series
French children's animated superhero television series
Anime-influenced Western animated television series
English-language television shows
Cartoon Network original programming
France Télévisions children's television series
Television shows set in San Francisco
Animated television series about children
Animated television series about robots
Gaumont Animation